Troy Lynn Ruttman (born March 11, 1930 – May 19, 1997) was an American race car driver. He was the older brother of Jimmy Ruttman, and NASCAR driver Joe Ruttman.

Ruttman won the Indianapolis 500 in 1952, at the age of 22 years and 80 days. , he is the youngest winner of the race.

From 1950–1960, the Indianapolis 500 also counted toward the World Drivers' Championship (now synonymous with Formula One), although most of the racers did not compete in the other races in the Championship.  Ruttman was the first Indianapolis 500 winner to participate in a Formula One event beyond Indy  and his 1952 Indy 500 win earned him the distinction of being the youngest driver to win a round of the World Championship, an honor he held until Fernando Alonso won the 2003 Hungarian Grand Prix.

Racing career
Ruttman entered his family car in a roadster race in San Bernardino, California in 1945 at age 15, and won the race. He won 19 of the 21 events staged there that season. By 1947 he was the California Roadster Association (CRA) roadster champion. He also won his first five midget car races that season. In 1948 he repeated as the CRA roadster champion, United Racing Association Blue Circuit (Offy) championship, and 23 midget car events.

Sprint car career
In May 1949 Ruttman left California for the AAA Sprint and Championship car circuits of the Midwest. He won three AAA Sprint Car championships over the next three and a half seasons. He competed in 51 midget races, winning 16 and placing in the top three 28 times.

He was injured in a sprint car crash in August 1952, which sidelined Ruttman for one and a half racing seasons. Ruttman returned in 1954 on a greatly reduced schedule.

Championship car career
He drove in the AAA and USAC Championship Car series, racing in the 1949–1952, 1954, 1956–1957 and 1960–1964 seasons with 58 starts, including the Indianapolis 500 races in 1949–1952, 1954, 1956–1957, and 1960–1964.  He finished in the top ten 26 times, with 5 victories and finished runner-up to Chuck Stevenson for the 1952 National Championship.

Stock car career
Ruttman won the 1956 USAC Short Track Stock Car division title. Ruttman also competed in 7 races in the NASCAR Grand National Series from 1962–1964, finishing in the top ten 5 times. His best finish was third at the 1963 race at Riverside International Raceway behind Dan Gurney and A. J. Foyt.

World Championship career summary
The Indianapolis 500 was part of the FIA World Championship from 1950 through 1960, and drivers competing at Indy during those years were credited with World Championship points and participation. Troy Ruttman participated in nine World Championship races, seven times at Indy plus the 1958 French and German Grands Prix. His 1952 Indianapolis 500 win was his only win and podium finish, and he earned a total of 9.5 championship points.

Career awards
He was inducted into the National Sprint Car Hall of Fame in 1993.
Ruttman was inducted into the Motorsports Hall of Fame of America in 2005.
He was inducted into the National Midget Auto Racing Hall of Fame in 2003.
Ruttman was inducted into the West Coast Stock Car Hall of Fame in its first class in 2002.
Inducted into the Indianapolis 500 Hall of Fame in May 1992.

Death
Ruttman died as a result of lung cancer on May 19, 1997 at Lake Havasu City, Arizona just a month before the long planned "Troy Ruttman Day" in his hometown of Mooreland, Oklahoma.

He was survived by his first wife Beverly Benson, and second wife Clara. He had seven children.

Complete AAA/USAC Championship Car results

Indianapolis 500 results

Complete Formula One World Championship results
(key)

† = Shared drive

References

1930 births
1997 deaths
Racing drivers from Oklahoma
American Formula One drivers
American people of German descent
Scuderia Centro Sud Formula One drivers
Indianapolis 500 drivers
Indianapolis 500 winners
NASCAR drivers
National Sprint Car Hall of Fame inductees
People from Woodward County, Oklahoma
Deaths from lung cancer
AAA Championship Car drivers
Formula One race winners
USAC Stock Car drivers